WWIO (1190 AM) is a Christian radio station licensed to serve St. Marys, Georgia, United States.  The station is owned by Lighthouse Christian Broadcasting Corporation, which also owns WECC-FM at Folkston, Georgia.  It broadcasts the same Christian programming as its sister station, WECC-FM 89.3, and it also broadcasts from its FM translator station W232DA 94.3 MHz, located at St. Marys.

The station was assigned the call sign "WWIO" by the Federal Communications Commission (FCC) on April 19, 2002.

WWIO has been granted an FCC construction permit to move to a different transmitter site, increase day power to 2,500 watts and add night service with 85 watts.

References

External links
 

Radio stations established in 1985
St. Marys, Georgia
WIO
WIO
1985 establishments in Georgia (U.S. state)